Michel Audoin (born 23 February 1957) is a sailor from France, who represented his country at the 1984 Summer Olympics in Los Angeles, United States as crew member in the Soling. With helmsman Patrick Haegeli and fellow crew member Philippe Massu they took the 14th place.

References

Living people
1957 births
Sailors at the 1984 Summer Olympics – Soling
Olympic sailors of France
French male sailors (sport)
20th-century French people